92nd Regiment or 92nd Infantry Regiment may refer to:

 92nd (Loyals) Light Anti-Aircraft Regiment, Royal Artillery 
 92nd (Gordon Highlanders) Regiment of Foot 

 American Civil War regiments 
 92nd Illinois Volunteer Infantry Regiment
 92nd Illinois Volunteer Mounted Infantry Regiment

See also
 92nd Division (disambiguation)
 92nd Brigade (disambiguation)
 92nd Squadron (disambiguation)